Sasha DiGiulian (born October 23, 1992) is a professional rock climber. She won the gold medal at the 2011 International Federation of Sport Climbing World Championships in Arco, Italy, for Female Overall, placed Silver in Bouldering and Bronze in Duel. Sasha won multi-year PanAmerican championships and is a three-time US National Champion. She has climbed over 30 First Female Ascents as well as over a dozen significant First Ascents, including "Rolihlahla" in South Africa, a Big Wall in Brazil in 2016 and The Misty Wall in Yosemite in 2017. In 2013 she was the first American woman to redpoint Era Vella 5.14d (9a), and established the First Female Ascent of Alpine Big Wall route, Bellavista, 5.14b (8c). In 2015, she became the first woman to free climb Magic Mushroom (7c+), one of the most difficult routes on the north face of the Eiger. In 2017 she did the first female ascent of Big Wall in Madagascar, Mora Mora (5.14b/8c), climbing it with Edu Marin in what was also the second free ascent of Mora Mora.

Biography
DiGiulian started her climbing career at the age of 6 and began competing at age 7. Prior to climbing, she competed as a figure skater. At age 11 she climbed her first 5.13b (8a). She attended the Potomac School, a K-12 near Washington, D.C. In March 2011, just before graduating from high school, she redpointed Southern Smoke (5.14c) and Lucifer (5.14c) in the Red River Gorge, Kentucky.

After leaving high school, DiGiulian took a gap year to travel and rock climb, concentrating on international competition and outdoor climbing. She won the Silver Medal in the Female Bouldering World Championships in Arco, Italy. She returned to the Red River Gorge in October 2011 where she redpointed Pure Imagination (5.14c). DiGiulian is a three-time National Champion in Female Open and was the undefeated Female Open panAmerican Champion from 2010 - 2018. From 2004 until the end of her Junior career, 2010, she was the undefeated junior Panamerican Champion. In 2011 she redpointed , onsighted two  and four  routes. In 2012 DiGiulian earned three gold medals at the Panamerican Championships for Female Sport Climbing, Bouldering, and Overall Champion. In 2015, she became the first woman to free climb Magic Mushroom (7c+), one of the most difficult routes on the north face of the Eiger. She has climbed over 30 First Female Ascents as well as 8 significant First Ascents, including a Big Wall in Brazil in 2016 and The Misty Wall in Yosemite in 2017. In 2017 she did the first female free ascent of Mora Mora, climbing it with Edu Marin in what was also the second free ascent of Mora Mora.

In 2014, DiGiulian's father, reportedly in healthy conditions, had a stroke and was rushed to the hospital. According to interviews with DiGiulian, he was perfectly healthy up until that point. He was put in a medically-induced coma and eventually passed away.

DiGiulian graduated from Columbia University in 2016. She studied non-fiction creative writing and business, was a member of Kappa Alpha Theta and an athlete representative on the board of the International Federation of Sport Climbing. DiGiulian serves as a Board Member of the Women's Sports Foundation and as an Athlete Ambassador for Right to Play, Up2Us Sports, Access Fund, American Alpine Club, and was the recipient of multiple prestigious awards, including GLAMOUR Magazine's Top College Women of the Year, 2016, the Cutting Edge Athlete Award for 2014 performance, presented by the American Alpine Club, The Golden Piton Award, and the Arco Rock Legend Award for Outstanding Achievements in the Outdoors.

As of January 2017, DiGiulian appears to be living in Boulder, Colorado. In March 2017 a rock climber emoji was approved and the sample image published by Emojipedia was based on DiGiulian's likeness.

DiGiulian produced a film, The Trilogy, about how she became the first female and second person to climb three Canadian Rocky Mountain big walls in a single season. The Trilogy was the first film she produced. It premiered in Banff.  DiGiulian – who is based in Boulder, Colorado – has become a vocal spokesperson on climate change and has lobbied in Washington, DC for protections.

In 2018, DiGiulian used her Instagram account to call out sexism and bias against her in her sport, particularly by Joe Kinder. DiGiulian said repeated offensive comments and harassment to her and towards fellow sportsmen are what led her to speak out.

References

External links

 
 

 27 Crags profile
 
 
 

American rock climbers
Female climbers
1992 births
Living people
American sportswomen
Columbia College (New York) alumni
21st-century American women
IFSC Climbing World Championships medalists
Boulder climbers